Enablement refers to any act of enabling.

Specific usages of the word enablement include:
 Application enablement
 Mobile sales enablement
 Supplier enablement, the process of electronically connecting suppliers to a company's supply chain
 Sufficiency of disclosure in patent law